Garganta's Thrilling Science was a comic book published in 2001 by A.C. Comics. The central character is Garganta, also known as Dr. Carol Heisler, who can transform herself into a giantess at will. The Garganta stories, drawn by Stephanie Sanderson, are supplemented by several classic comic-book adventures. Garganta is also a regular character in the Femforce comic book, where she appears in her own section Gargantarama.

Garganta's Thrilling Science was originally intended to be a continuing series, but only one issue (#1) has so far appeared.

AC Comics titles
Fiction about size change